Salomon or Schlomo Bernstein (1886 in Uzda, Belarus – 1968 in Holon, Israel) was a painter. He completed art studies in Vilnius, Odessa as well as at École nationale supérieure des Beaux-Arts, Paris. He immigrated to Ottoman Palestine in 1914, and studied at the Bezalel Academy of Arts and Design. He was one of the founders of the Hebrew Artists’ Association in 1920.

References 
Dictionary of Artists: Bedeschini - Bülow
Volume 2 of Dictionary of Artists, Christopher John Murray (Ed.), 2006 ,

External links 
 http://www.askart.com/AskART/artists/search/Search_Repeat.aspx?searchtype=IMAGES&artist=11015978 AskArt

1886 births
1968 deaths
Emigrants from the Russian Empire to the Ottoman Empire
Israeli artists
Burials at Trumpeldor Cemetery